This is a comprehensive listing of official music video releases by the Lebanese singer Amal Hijazi.

Videography
Hijazi, Amal